The Warren-Guild-Simmons House, also known as Fairview Inn, is a historic mansion in Jackson, Mississippi, U.S..

History
The house was built in 1908 for Cyrus C. Warren, the vice president of the Warren-Goodwin Lumber Company. Felix Gunter, the president of the Jackson Board of Trade, was the homeowner from 1913 to 1921, when it was purchased by W. E. Guild, the treasurer of the Finkbine Lumber Company. D. C. Simmons, the president of the Bank of Utica and the Utica Lumber and Gin Company, was the homeowner from 1930 to 1964. It was inherited by their son William L. Simmons in the 1970s. In the 1950s, he had founded the Jackson Citizens' Council, a white supremacist organization.

Architectural significance
The house was designed in the Colonial Revival style by the architectural firm Spencer & Powers. It has been listed on the National Register of Historic Places since January 11, 1979.

References

External links
 

Houses on the National Register of Historic Places in Mississippi
Colonial Revival architecture in Mississippi
Houses completed in 1909
Houses in Jackson, Mississippi
National Register of Historic Places in Jackson, Mississippi